Francesco Isvales (died 1512) was a Roman Catholic prelate who served as Archbishop of Reggio Calabria (1506–1512).

On 24 July 1506, Francesco Isvales was appointed during the papacy of Pope Julius II as Archbishop of Reggio Calabria.
He served as Archbishop of Reggio Calabria until his death in 1512.

References

External links and additional sources
 (for Chronology of Bishops) 
 (for Chronology of Bishops) 

16th-century Roman Catholic archbishops in the Kingdom of Naples
Bishops appointed by Pope Julius II
1512 deaths